A basaloid follicular hamartoma is a cutaneous condition characterized as distinctive benign adnexal tumor that has several described variants.

See also 
 Hamartoma
 Cutaneous condition 
 List of cutaneous conditions

References

Further reading

External links 

Epidermal nevi, neoplasms, and cysts